Iru Dhuruvam is an Indian Tamil-language crime thriller streaming television series produced as an Original for SonyLIV, written and directed by debutant M Kumaran. Produced by Sameer Nair and Pramod Cheruvalath under the banner Applause Entertainment and A Sign Of Life Productions, the series stars Nandha Durairaj in the lead role along with Abdool, Sebastin Antony and Abhirami Venkatachalam. The series marked the first Tamil Original streaming series produced for SonyLIV and the first season released on 29 September 2019 with nine episodes. In October 2021, it is reported the series has been renewed for the second season and it was released on February 24 2023.

Cast
 Nandha Durairaj as Viktor Selladurai
 Abdool as Kishore
 Sebastin Antony as Gunasekaran
 Abhirami Venkatachalam as Geetha
 Jeeva Ravi as Rangaraj Tripathi
 P. Aneesha as Gayathri
 Ajit Koshy as Manova Devanesan
 Balaji as Prabhakaran
 Nandhini Madhesh as Keerthana
 Karthik Nagarajan as Tech guy

Reception
The series opened to extreme positive reviews from critics. Sify said, "Iru Dhuruvam does finally manage to achieve what it set out to and for one definitely hope to see Viktor and Kishore in Season 2 pretty soon!" Republic World wrote, "Iru Dhuruvam is a crime thriller that consists of the common elements of the genre but still manages to keep you hooked to your screen because of the deft direction by M Kumaran. The story grabs your attention with its edge of the seat narrative." Binged.com gave a rating of 6 out on 10 and called the series a reasonably sharp Psycho-Thriller.

Series overview

Episodes

Season 1

== References ==

External links 
 

SonyLIV original programming
Tamil-language web series
Tamil-language thriller television series
Tamil-language crime television series
2017 Tamil-language television series debuts